Laternea pusilla is a species of fungi in the family Phallaceae.

External links

Phallales
Fungi described in 1868